Baker Airport  is a public airport located two miles (3 km) northwest of the central business district of Baker, in San Bernardino County, California, United States. It is owned by the U.S. Department of the Interior, Bureau of Land Management.

Facilities and aircraft 
For the 12-month period ending February 16, 2006, the airport had 500 general aviation aircraft operations, an average of 42 per month.

References

External links 

Airports in San Bernardino County, California
Bureau of Land Management